Emir, sometimes transliterated amir, amier, or ameer, is a word of Arabic origin that can refer to a male monarch, aristocrat, holder of high-ranking military or political office, or other person possessing actual or ceremonial authority. The title has a long history of use in the Arab World, East Africa, West Africa, Central Asia, and the Indian subcontinent. In the modern era, when used as a formal monarchical title, it is roughly synonymous with "prince", applicable both to a son of a hereditary monarch, and to a reigning monarch of a sovereign principality, namely an emirate. The feminine form is emira, a cognate for "princess".  Prior to its use as a monarchical title, the term "emir" was historically used to denote a "commander", "general",  or "leader" (for example, Amir al-Mu'min). In contemporary usage, "emir" is also sometimes used as either an honorary or formal title for the head of an Islamic, or Arab (regardless of religion) organisation or movement.

Qatar and Kuwait are the only independent countries which retain the title "emir" for their monarchs. In recent years, the title has been gradually replaced by "king" by contemporary hereditary rulers who wish to emphasize their secular authority under the rule of law. A notable example is Bahrain, whose monarch changed his title from emir to king in 2002.

Origins 

Amir, meaning "lord" or "commander-in-chief", is derived from the Arabic root , "command".  Originally simply meaning "commander", it came to be used as a title of leaders, governors, or rulers of smaller states. In modern Arabic the word is analogous to the title "Prince". The word entered English in 1593, from the French . It was one of the titles or names of the Islamic prophet Muhammad.

Princely, ministerial and noble titles 

 The monarchs of Qatar and Kuwait are currently titled emir.
 All members of the House of Saud have the title of emir (prince).
 Afghanistan under the government of the Taliban is officially an emirate de facto, with the leader of the Taliban bearing the title .
 The caliphs first used the title Amir al-Muminin or "Commander of the Faithful", stressing their leadership over the Islamic empire, especially over the militia. The title has been assumed by various other Muslim rulers, including sultans and emirs. For Shia Muslims, they still give this title to the Caliph Ali as Amir al-Muminin.
 The Abbasid (in theory still universal) Caliph Al-Radi created the post of Amir al-Umara ("Amir of the Amirs") for Ibn Raik; the title was used in various Islamic monarchies; see below for military use. In Iraq, the direct descendants of previous Emirs from the largest tribes, such as the Shammar and Khuza’ah tribes, who ruled the kingdoms before modern statehood, use the title of Sheikh or Prince as the progeny of royalty.
 Formerly in Lebanon, the ruling emir formally used the style al-Amir al-Hakim, specifying it was still the ruler's title. Note that the title was held by Druze and Christians as well.
 The word emir is also used less formally for leaders in certain contexts. For example, the leader of a group of pilgrims to Mecca is called an emir hadji, a title sometimes used by ruling princes (as a mark of Muslim piety) which is sometimes awarded in their name. Where an adjectival form is necessary, "emiral" suffices.
 Amirzade, the son (hence the Persian patronymic suffix -zade) of a prince, hence the Persian princely title mirza.
 The traditional rulers of the predominantly Muslim northern regions of Nigeria are known as emirs, while the titular sovereign of their now defunct empire is formally styled as the Sultan of Sokoto, Amir-al-Muminin (or Sarkin Musulmi in the Hausa language).
 The temporal leader of the Yazidi people is known as an emir or prince.
 Amīr al-Baḥr ("commander of the sea") is considered to be the etymological origin of the English admiral, the French  and similar terms in other European languages.

Military ranks and titles 

From the start, emir has been a military title. In the 9th century the term was used to denote a ruler of a state i.e. Italy's Emirate of Sicily.

In certain decimally-organized Muslim armies, Amir was an officer rank. For example, in Mughal India, the Amirs commanded 1000 horsemen (divided into ten units, each under a sipah salar), ten of them under one malik. In the imperial army of Qajar Persia:
 Amir-i-Nuyan
 Amir Panj, "Commander of 5,000"
 Amir-i-Tuman, "Commander of 10,000"

The following posts referred to "amir" under medieval Muslim states include:
 Amir al-umara, "Amir of Amirs" (cfr. supra) or 'Commander of Commanders'
 Amir al-hajj, "Commander of the Hajj [caravan]"
 Amir al-ʿarab, "Commander of the Arabs [Bedouin tribes]"

In the former Kingdom of Afghanistan, Amir-i-Kabir was a title meaning "great prince" or "great commander".

Muhammad Amin Bughra, Nur Ahmad Jan Bughra, and Abdullah Bughra declared themselves emirs of the First East Turkestan Republic.

Other uses 
 Amir is a masculine name in the Persian language and a prefix name for many masculine names such as Amir Ali, Amir Abbas.
 Amir-i-Iel designates the head of an Il (tribe) in imperial Persia.
 The masculine Amir and feminine Amira are Arabic-language names common among both Arabs regardless of religion and Muslims regardless of ethnicity, much as Latin Rex and Regina ("king" and "queen," respectively) are common in the Western world. In Bosnia and Herzegovina, the female name Emira, often interpreted as "princess", is a derivative of the male name Emir.
 The masculine Amir and feminine Amira are Hebrew-language names that are relatively common in Israel. In Hebrew the word can also mean "bundle of grain" or "treetop" depending on the spelling.

See also 

 Beg
 Bey
 Caliph
 Hammira (disambiguation)
 Imam
 Mir
 Mirza
 Padishah
 Pasha
 Prince
 Rana
 Sayyid
 Shah
 Sheikh
 Sultan
 Vizier

Specific emirates of note
 List of emirs of Harar
 List of emirs of Kuwait
 List of emirs of Qatar
 List of emirs of Mosul
 Emirate of Afghanistan

References 

 
Arab military ranks
Arabic words and phrases
Court titles
Executive ministers
Gubernatorial titles
Heads of state
Islamic honorifics
Military ranks
Noble titles
Ottoman titles
Religious leadership roles
Royal titles
Titles in Afghanistan
Titles in Iran
Titles in Pakistan
Titles of national or ethnic leadership